"Feelin' Stronger Every Day" is a song written by Peter Cetera and James Pankow for the group Chicago and recorded for their album Chicago VI (1973). The first single released from that album, it reached #10 on the U.S. Billboard Hot 100.

Development
The song was a collaboration between bassist Peter Cetera and trombonist James Pankow. Regarding the composition, drummer Danny Seraphine said, "Peter wrote that song [with trombonist James Pankow] about his marriage falling apart. He'd gone through a real hard time and was starting to feel stronger again."

Cetera himself recalled, "I can remember the exact beginnings of that one... We were at the Akron Rubber Bowl in Akron, Ohio, an outdoor gig that was delayed a bit because of rain, and so, we got there our normal hour and a half before the gig, and we're sitting around, and we were told we're gonna hold for at least an hour, and I heard Jimmy [Pankow] in the other room playing the actual beginning of that song... and I said, 'What is that?' and he went, 'Oh, I don't know, I'm just messing around.'... I went and got my bass, and we sat there and played around with it, and a few weeks later, after we got off the road, I went to his house, and we wrote 'Feelin' Stronger Every Day'."

Pankow noted that "'Stronger Every Day' was about a relationship but yet, underlying that relationship it's almost like the band is feeling stronger than ever.”

Cetera played bass and sang lead vocals, while keyboardist Robert Lamm played Hohner Pianet as well as acoustic piano.

Reception
Cash Box said that with this song "Chicago undergoes a slight change in musical directions by straying somewhat away from the sharp horn lines that have so successfully represented their sound in the past."

Personnel
 Peter Cetera – lead vocals, bass
 Robert Lamm – keyboards, backing vocals, Fender Rhodes electric piano
 Terry Kath – guitar, backing vocals
 Danny Seraphine – drums
 James Pankow – trombone
 Lee Loughnane – trumpet
 Walter Parazaider – tenor saxophone

Chart performance

Weekly charts

Year-end charts

References

External links
 

1973 singles
Chicago (band) songs
Songs written by Peter Cetera
Songs written by James Pankow
Song recordings produced by James William Guercio
Columbia Records singles